The 1926 Oregon Agricultural Aggies football team represented Oregon Agricultural College (now known as Oregon State University) in the Pacific Coast Conference (PCC) during the 1926 college football season.  In their third season under head coach Paul J. Schissler, the Beavers compiled a 7–1 record (4–1 against PCC opponents), finished in a tie for third place in the PCC, and outscored their opponents, 221 to 30. Under coach Schissler, from 1925 to 1932, no team captains were elected.  The team played its home games at Bell Field in Corvallis, Oregon.

Schedule

References

Oregon Agricultural
Oregon State Beavers football seasons
Oregon Agricultural Aggies football